Sunshine Rainbows and Violins is the fifth studio album by Dutch-Australian children's musician Franciscus Henri. It was recorded with John Bye and the Kinder Players and was released in 1981 by John Bye Productions and distributed by Move Records on 33 rpm vinyl record and cassette. In 2011, it was remastered and re-released on CD with 28 tracks on FHP Records.: 3

Track listing

References

1981 albums
Franciscus Henri albums